Keep It Up, Jack is a 1974 British sex comedy film directed by Derek Ford and produced by Michael L. Green. Jack James (Mark Jones), an unsuccessful music hall entertainer and drag artist, inherits a brothel from his late aunt, and impersonates her in order to seduce the female clients. The film also exists in a version with hardcore inserts, but there is no suggestion that any of the credited cast participated in it.  In January 2022 it was announced that Dark Force Entertainment will release the longer, hardcore version of the film on blu-ray.

Cast
 Mark Jones as Jack
 Sue Longhurst as Virginia
 Linda Regan as Gloria
 Frank Thornton as Mr. Clarke
 Queenie Watts as Char Lady
 Paul Whitsun-Jones as Mr. Fairbrother
 Maggi Burton as Fleur
 Steve Veidor as Muscles
 Jennifer Westbrook as Caroline

References

External links
 

1970s English-language films
1974 films
British sex comedy films
Films set in England
Films shot in England
1970s sex comedy films
Cross-dressing in film
1977 comedy films
1977 films
1975 comedy films
1975 films
1974 comedy films
Films directed by Derek Ford
1970s British films